Pleasanton Independent School District is a public school district based in Pleasanton, Texas (USA).

In 2011, the School District was rated "Academically Acceptable" by the Texas Education Agency.

The ratings varied greatly from campus to campus with the Primary, Elementary and Intermediate campuses receiving a rating of Recognized, the Junior High received a rating of Academically Acceptable while the High School and the School of Choice were rated as Academically Unacceptable.

Schools
In the 2017–2018 school year, the district had students in seven schools. 
High schools
Pleasanton High School (Grades 9–12)
Middle schools
Pleasanton Junior High (Grades 6–8)
Elementary schools
Pleasanton Elementary (Grades 2–5)
Pleasanton Primary (Grades EE-2)
Alternative schools
Pleasanton ISD School of Choice (Grades 9–12)
Atascosa County Alternative School (Grades 5–12)
Pleasanton ISD Reassignment and Opportunity Center (Grades 6–12)

References 
2011 T.E.A. Accountability System - District and School Accountability Ratings

External links
 

School districts in Atascosa County, Texas